John Moyle was a 17th-century Cornish parliamentarian.

John Moyle may also refer to:

John Moyle (British Army officer) (died 1738), major-general
John Rowe Moyle (1808–1889), Mormon pioneer
John Moyle (1908-1960), editor of Radio Television & Hobbies and Australian radio pioneer

See also
Moyle (disambiguation)
Moyle (surname)